Kreise is the fifth studio album by German singer-songwriter Johannes Oerding. It was released on May 5, 2017 by Columbia Records.

Track listing

Charts

Weekly charts

Year-end charts

Certifications

References

2017 albums
Johannes Oerding albums